Kerry Leigh Francis Marshall  (21 May 1940 – 3 March 2020) was a New Zealand politician who was active in local government in the northern part of New Zealand's South Island. He was mayor of three territorial authorities: Richmond borough (1986–1989), Tasman (1989–1998), and Nelson (2007–2010).

Early life
Born in Richmond in 1940, Marshall was the son of baker Cedric Marshall, who was active in the labour movement in Nelson. He was educated at Nelson College from 1954 to 1958.

Career
Both Marshall and his wife were teachers by profession. He worked in Canada, Scotland and Banks Peninsula for some time before returning to Nelson in 1980.  He became a Richmond borough councillor in 1982 and was elected mayor of Richmond in 1986. Following the 1989 local government reforms, he became the first mayor of the Tasman District (serving for nine years). He served as president of Local Government New Zealand, and was a local government commissioner from 2001 to 2005. In 2007, Marshall was elected mayor of Nelson, defeating eight other candidates including Gary Watson of Mainland Television.

Marshall was also the presiding member of the New Zealand Lotteries Commission and chair of the New Zealand Conservation Authority until 2008.

Marshall served as chair of the New Zealand Visitor Information Network, a member of the New Zealand Geographic Board, chair of the Greyhound As Pets Trust, a trustee of the Cawthron Institute of Science and Technology, chair of the New Zealand World of Wearable Art Development Trust, and chair of the Tasman Environmental Trust.

Marshall was the owner of the Kerry Marshall Company, undertaking consultancy in leadership, management, facilitation, administration, communication and public relations.

Marshall died in Nelson on 3 March 2020.

Honours and awards
In the 1989 Queen's Birthday Honours, Marshall was appointed a Member of the Order of the British Empire, for services to local government. He was awarded the New Zealand 1990 Commemoration Medal in 1990, the Sir Jack Newman Award to Nelson's Outstanding Citizen of the Year awarded by the Rotary Club of Nelson in 1999, and the United States Information Service Study Award to the United States, also in 1999.

Family
Marshall was the brother of New Zealand politician Russell Marshall. The Marshall brothers married the Nelson sisters Colleen and Barbara Watson. Colleen Marshall, the wife of Kerry Marshall, was head of music at Nelson College for Girls until her retirement. She was appointed a Member of the New Zealand Order of Merit for services to the arts in the 2014 Queen's Birthday Honours.

References 

1940 births
2020 deaths
Mayors of Nelson, New Zealand
People educated at Nelson College
New Zealand Members of the Order of the British Empire
Mayors of Tasman
People associated with the Cawthron Institute
New Zealand justices of the peace
Mayors of Richmond, New Zealand